Fortier is a French-language Canadian television series which debuted on the TVA network in Quebec from February 3, 2000, and ended on April 1, 2004. A subtitled version later aired on the English-language CBC Television network, as part of its now-defunct late-night Best of French Canada anthology series, then followed by broadcast internationally on TV5 Monde, and later re-showing again for the disability network AMI-tv on July 18, 2017.

It was made by Aetios Productions, and the show's creator, writer and producer Fabienne Larouche.

Synopsis
Anne Fortier (Lorain) is a criminal psychologist from Montréal, who works with the investigators of SAS (Anti-Sociopathic Service), a fictional police division specialising in crimes involving abnormal psychology. Although their sordid crimes include those of a shoe thief and a pyromaniac, most of the cases given a lot of time on the series are ruthless murders, often serial killings.

While solving these cases Fortier and her colleagues must wrestle with her own murky past and several psychological issues.

Cast

Main characters

Recurring characters

Notable guest stars

Episode list

Awards and recognition
The series earned Michèle-Barbara Pelletier as the role of Magali Simon a Prix Gémeaux took place on September 30, 2001, for Best Supporting Actress - Series or Dramatic Program from her appearance in episodes two and three ("Elles ne sont qu'une...") of the second season.

Four other Prix Gémeaux nominations were given in the category Best Supporting Actor - Series or Dramatic Program, such as François Papineau for the role of Claude Lizotte in two episodes ("L'homme froid") of the second season.

See also

 Television in Québec

References

External links
 

2000 Canadian television series debuts
2004 Canadian television series endings
2000s Canadian drama television series
TVA (Canadian TV network) original programming
CBC Television original programming
Television shows set in Montreal